Alpes Lasers S.A. is a Swiss engineering company and manufacturer of Infrared lasers and electrical drivers based in St-Blaise, Neuchatel. The company was the first to commercialize the quantum cascade laser (QCL) for scientific, industrial and medical use. The company has also developed QCLs for defensive countermeasure applications for the United States Air Force.

The company was founded in 1998 by physicists Jerome Faist (de), Antoine Muller and Matthias Beck as a spin-off from the University of Neuchâtel. The company became involved in the design, manufacture and distribution of QCLs, which were first developed by Jerome Faist, Federico Capasso, Deborah Sivco, Carlo Sirtori, Albert Hutchinson, and Alfred Cho at Bell Laboratories in 1994. Prior to founding Alpes Lasers, Faist co-authored the US patent for the quantum cascade laser. In Switzerland, the firm has worked on projects with the university of Neuchatel and ETH Zurich where Faist currently holds a professorship in the department of physics.

In 2007, Alpes Lasers supplied NASA with lasers for gas analysis instruments on Mars rovers.

In 2017, the firm introduced QCL frequency combs commercially.

References

Electronics companies of Switzerland

Semiconductor companies of Switzerland
Technology companies of Switzerland